Ten Broeck is a home rule-class city in Jefferson County, Kentucky, United States. The population was 103 at the 2010 census.

Geography
Ten Broeck is located in northeastern Jefferson County at  (38.295102, -85.579821). It is bordered to the west by Manor Creek and Broeck Pointe, to the southwest by Murray Hill, and on all other sides by consolidated Louisville/Jefferson County. Kentucky Route 22 (Brownsboro Road) forms the northern border of the community.

Demographics

As of the census of 2000, there were 129 people, 47 households, and 39 families residing in the city. The racial makeup of the city was 94.57% White, 1.55% African American, 2.33% Asian, and 1.55% from two or more races. Hispanic or Latino of any race were 0.78% of the population.

There were 47 households, out of which 38.3% had children under the age of 18 living with them, 78.7% were married couples living together, 2.1% had a female householder with no husband present, and 17.0% were non-families. 14.9% of all households were made up of individuals, and 8.5% had someone living alone who was 65 years of age or older. The average household size was 2.74 and the average family size was 3.08.

In the city, the population was spread out, with 25.6% under the age of 18, 5.4% from 18 to 24, 16.3% from 25 to 44, 35.7% from 45 to 64, and 17.1% who were 65 years of age or older. The median age was 46 years. For every 100 females, there were 98.5 males. For every 100 females age 18 and over, there were 108.7 males.

The median income for a household in the city was $134,063, and the median income for a family was $138,174. Males had a median income of $100,000 versus $82,038 for females. The per capita income for the city was $51,593. None of the population and none of the families were below the poverty line.

References

Cities in Jefferson County, Kentucky
Cities in Kentucky
Louisville metropolitan area
Populated places established in 1979